Quinethazone (INN, brand name Hydromox) is a thiazide-like diuretic used to treat hypertension.  Common side effects include dizziness, dry mouth, nausea, and low potassium levels.

References

Thiazides
Quinazolinones
Chloroarenes
Carbonic anhydrase inhibitors